LVS may refer to:

Layout Versus Schematic electronic circuit verification
Linux Virtual Server, load balancing software
Light Value Scale in photography
LVS Ascot, Licensed Victuallers' School, Berkshire, UK
Logistics Vehicle System, USMC tactical vehicles
LVS-86, a Russian tram
LVS-97, a Russian tram
LVS may be one of the following codes:
the NYSE ticker for Las Vegas Sands
the IATA and FAA code for Las Vegas Municipal Airport
Las Vegas Strip